Steven Lawrence Bencich (born October 31, 1970) is an American screenwriter and film director best known for his work with writing partner Ron J. Friedman.

Bencich and Friedman have collaborated on screenplays for several animated films, including Brother Bear, Chicken Little, and Open Season.  DreamWorks has purchased their comedy screenplay Gullible's Travels.

In 2020, he wrote and directed the feature "Wish Upon A Unicorn" for Universal 1440.

Filmography
Screenplays, all co-written with Ron J. Friedman:
 The Best Movie Ever Made (1994)
 Brother Bear (2003)
 Chicken Little (2005)
 Open Season (2006)
 Cats & Dogs: The Revenge of Kitty Galore (2010)
 The Monkey King (2023)

As producer only:
 10.0 Earthquake (2014)

As writer and director:
 Wish Upon a Unicorn (2020)

References

External links
 

American male screenwriters
American film directors
Animation screenwriters
1970 births
Living people
Walt Disney Animation Studios people
Sony Pictures Animation people